Jean-Claude Casties (born November 11, 1936) is a French former professional association football player and manager.

External links
Jean-Claude Casties playing career at footballdatabase.eu
Trainers of First and Second division clubs at rsssf.com

1936 births
Living people
French footballers
French football managers
FC Girondins de Bordeaux players
AS Cannes players
AC Ajaccio players
Chamois Niortais F.C. managers
Ligue 1 players
Ligue 2 players
Association football defenders